We can may refer to:

 We Can (song), a LeAnn Rimes song
 We can! (Croatia), a political party in Croatia
 "We Can", a song by James Morrison from his 2015 album Higher Than Here

See also 
 Yes We Can (disambiguation)
 We Can Do It!, an American image and slogan
 
 Podemos (disambiguation) (Spanish and Portuguese for 'We can')